The 2015 Montana Grizzlies football team represented the University of Montana in the 2015 NCAA Division I FCS football season. The Grizzlies were led by first-year coach Bob Stitt who took over after 15 years coaching the NCAA Division II Colorado Mines Orediggers.  The Grizzlies played their home games on campus at Washington–Grizzly Stadium. Montana participated as a member of the Big Sky Conference, of which they are a charter member. They finished the season 8–5, 6–2 in Big Sky play to finish in a tie for second place. They received an at-large bid to the FCS Playoffs where they defeated South Dakota State in the first round before losing in the second round to North Dakota State.

Schedule

Source: Official Schedule

Despite also being a member of the Big Sky Conference, the game with Cal Poly on September 5 is considered a non-conference game.

Game summaries

North Dakota State

Cal Poly

@ Liberty

Northern Arizona

@ UC Davis

Weber State

North Dakota

@ Portland State

@ Idaho State

Eastern Washington

@ Montana State

FCS Playoffs

First Round–South Dakota State

Second Round–@ North Dakota State

Ranking movements

References

Montana
Montana Grizzlies football seasons
Montana
Montana Grizzlies football